Hou Baolin (November 29, 1917 – February 4, 1993) was a Chinese xiangsheng performer. He was one of his generation's most popular and influential xiangsheng performers and was mentor to many later xiangsheng performers. His apprentices include Ma Ji, Ding Guangquan, Shi Shengjie, and Wu Zhaonan. He was the father of Hou Yaohua and Hou Yaowen.

Biography
Hou Baolin was born in Tianjin, China on November 29, 1917. He joined the Peking Opera Troupe at the age of 12, before switching his profession to being a xiangsheng performer, in which he studied under Zhu Kuoquan. After the founding of new China, the social status of folk performers rose considerably. Hou joined the Quyi Art Troupe of the Chinese Broadcasting Recitation and Ballad Troupe and made major contributions to China's xiangsheng art.

Personal 
Hou's third wife was Wang Yalan. Hou had three sons and two daughters, including Hou Yaohua and Hou Yaowen.
Hou died on February 4, 1993, at the age of 76 of stomach cancer. He was buried at Babaoshan Revolutionary Cemetery, in Beijing, China.

References

External links
Maine University. 2008. Photo of tomb of Hou Baolin and his wife at Babaoshan Revolutionary Cemetery in Beijing, China. Photo taken by Marilyn Shea.

1917 births
1993 deaths
Chinese male comedians
Chinese male stage actors
Chinese xiangsheng performers
Male actors from Tianjin
20th-century Chinese male actors
20th-century comedians
Burials at Babaoshan Revolutionary Cemetery
Manchu male actors